Darwin L. Peters Jr. (born November 7, 1964) is an American professional stock car racing mechanic, crew chief, and driver. He last competed part-time in the NASCAR Gander Outdoors Truck Series, driving the No. 74 Chevrolet Silverado for Lou Goss Racing.

Racing career
Peters has worked for various NASCAR teams in technical roles. In 2017, working at TJL Motorsports, he served as Mike Harmon's crew chief for the Truck Series race at Atlanta Motor Speedway. In 2019, he was a mechanic for MBM Motorsports.

As a driver, Peters made his debut at Eldora Speedway driving the No. 74 Chevrolet Silverado for Lou Goss Racing. He started 30th after finishing 5th of 7 cars in the Last Chance Qualify and finished 17th in the main event.

Motorsports career results

NASCAR
(key) (Bold – Pole position awarded by qualifying time. Italics – Pole position earned by points standings or practice time. * – Most laps led.)

Gander Outdoors Truck Series

References

External links
 
 

NASCAR drivers
NASCAR crew chiefs
1964 births
Living people
People from Olean, New York
Racing drivers from New York (state)